Long Shujin (November 1910 – April 16, 2003) was a People's Liberation Army major general and a People's Republic of China politician. He was born in Hunan Province. He was Chairman of Xinjiang (1967–1972).

 

1910 births
2003 deaths
People's Liberation Army generals from Hunan
People's Republic of China politicians from Hunan
Chinese Communist Party politicians from Hunan
Politicians from Zhuzhou
Political office-holders in Xinjiang